Timothy Dayle Wood (born November 16, 1982) is an American former professional baseball pitcher. He  pitched for the Pittsburgh Pirates and Florida Marlins of Major League Baseball.

Baseball career
Wood was drafted by the Montreal Expos in the 21st round of the 2001 Major League Baseball Draft out of Sabino High School, but did not sign. He was drafted by the Florida Marlins in the 44th round of the 2002 Major League Baseball Draft out of Pima Community College.

Florida Marlins
Wood was drafted by the Florida Marlins in the 44th round of the 2002 Major League Baseball Draft out of Pima Community College. He was brought up to the majors on June 4, 2009, but was optioned back to the minors on June 7 without appearing in a game. The Marlins called him up once again on June 21. Wood made his major league debut June 25, 2009, pitching 2 scoreless innings against the Baltimore Orioles. The first batter he faced, Robert Andino, lined out to second base. On April 7, 2010, Wood recorded the only save of his MLB career. He pitched the 10th inning to close out a 7-6 victory over the Mets.

Washington Nationals
The Washington Nationals signed Wood in November 2010. The Nationals released Wood in March 2011.

Pittsburgh Pirates
The Pittsburgh Pirates signed Wood in April 2011. On June 10, 2011, the Pirates purchased Wood's contract. He was designated for assignment on August 12, after making 13 appearances, recording a 5.63 ERA in eight innings. He was traded to the Texas Rangers on August 18, in exchange for cash considerations.

Texas Rangers
The Texas Rangers acquired Wood from the Pittsburgh Pirates on August 18, in exchange for cash considerations. He became a free agent at the end of the 2011 season.

Return to the Pirates
In November 2011, Wood signed a minor league contract with the Pittsburgh Pirates. In 54 games for the Pirates' Triple-A affiliate Indianapolis, Wood had a 2.19 ERA with 21 saves while striking out 67 in 70 innings.

Minnesota Twins
On November 10, 2012, Wood was reported to be close to a deal with the Cleveland Indians. Later the same day, he signed a minor league deal with the Minnesota Twins with an invitation to spring training and is expected to make the team. The club then signed him to a 1-year, $675,000 deal to avoid losing him in the Rule 5 Draft. He was released on August 28, 2013.

References

External links

1982 births
Living people
Baseball players from Tucson, Arizona
Florida Marlins players
Pittsburgh Pirates players
Jamestown Jammers players
Greensboro Bats players
Jupiter Hammerheads players
Carolina Mudcats players
New Orleans Zephyrs players
Pima Aztecs baseball players
Indianapolis Indians players
Major League Baseball pitchers
Fort Myers Miracle players
Rochester Red Wings players